Serbia participated in the Junior Eurovision Song Contest 2010, in Minsk, Belarus. in September 2010, the Serbian radio and television broadcaster RTS held a national competition, "Dečja Pesma Evrovizije 2010" to select the Serbian entry for the contest. From ten finalists, Sonja Škorić from Minsk was selected. Her song was a ballad called Čarobna noć.

Before Junior Eurovision

National final 
Ten applicants competed to be selected as the representative for Serbia.

Sonja Škorić
Sonja Škorić (born 1996, Pančevo) from Belgrade represented Serbia at Junior Eurovision Song Contest in 2010. Skoric began singing lessons at age five years. In 2002, at age six years, she placed first at the "Raspevano proleće" festival.

At Junior Eurovision 
During the allocation draw on 14 October 2010, Serbia was drawn to perform 4th, following Netherlands and preceding Ukraine. Serbia placed 3rd, scoring 113 points.

In Serbia, show were broadcast on RTS 2 with commentary by Duška Vučinić-Lučić. The Serbian spokesperson revealing the result of the Serbian vote was Maja Mazić who represented Serbia in 2008 contest.

Voting

Notes

References

External links 
  RTS website

Junior Eurovision Song Contest
Serbia
Junior Eurovision Song Contest
2010